Buick Velite may refer to:

 Buick Velite, a 2004 concept car
 Buick Velite 6, a production electric car introduced in China in 2019 which is unique to that market
 Buick Velite 7, a production electric car introduced in China in 2020 which is unique to that market